Metriochroa tylophorae is a moth of the family Gracillariidae. It is known from South Africa.

The larvae feed on Tylophora cordata. They probably mine the leaves of their host plant.

References

Endemic moths of South Africa
Phyllocnistinae
Moths of Africa